Kunturi (Aymara for condor, hispanicized spelling Condori) is a mountain in the Wansu mountain range in the Andes of Peru, about  high. It is located in the Arequipa Region, La Unión Province, Puyca District. Kunturi lies east of a lake named Ikmaqucha. Taypi Q'awa is the mountain northeast of it. The intermittent streams south of Kunturi flow to the Uqururu (Aymara and Quechua for Mimulus glabratus, hispanicized Ojoruro), also known as Sumana or Cotahuasi, which flows to the Cotahuasi Canyon in the southwest.

References 

Mountains of Peru
Mountains of Arequipa Region